Nepenthes singalana (after Mount Singgalang, West Sumatra) is a tropical pitcher plant endemic to the island of Sumatra, where it grows at 2000–2900 m above sea level. It is most closely allied to N. diatas and N. spathulata.

Taxonomy

In 2001, Charles Clarke performed a cladistic analysis of the Nepenthes species of Sumatra and Peninsular Malaysia using 70 morphological characteristics of each taxon. The following is part of the resultant cladogram, showing "Clade 3", which comprises N. singalana and three other related species.

Natural hybrids

The following natural hybrids involving N. singalana have been recorded.

N. aristolochioides × N. singalana
N. bongso × N. singalana
N. gymnamphora × N. singalana
N. inermis × N. singalana
? N. singalana × N. spathulata

References

Further reading

 Bauer, U., C.J. Clemente, T. Renner & W. Federle 2012. Form follows function: morphological diversification and alternative trapping strategies in carnivorous Nepenthes pitcher plants. Journal of Evolutionary Biology 25(1): 90–102. 
 Clarke, C. & C.C. Lee 2012. A revision of Nepenthes (Nepenthaceae) from Gunung Tahan, Peninsular Malaysia. Gardens' Bulletin Singapore 64(1): 33–49.
  Desti 2009. Anatomi daun dua jenis kantung semar (Nepenthes ampullaria Jack dan Nepenthes singalana Becc.). Thesis, Andalas University, Padang. Abstract 
 Hernawati & P. Akhriadi 2006. A Field Guide to the Nepenthes of Sumatra. PILI-NGO Movement, Bogor.
 Macfarlane, J.M. 1914. Family XCVI. Nepenthaceæ. [pp. 279–288] In: J.S. Gamble. Materials for a flora of the Malayan Peninsula, No. 24. Journal & Proceedings of the Asiatic Society of Bengal 75(3): 279–391.
  Mansur, M. 2001.  In: Prosiding Seminar Hari Cinta Puspa dan Satwa Nasional. Lembaga Ilmu Pengetahuan Indonesia, Bogor. pp. 244–253.
  Meimberg, H. 2002.  Ph.D. thesis, Ludwig Maximilian University of Munich, Munich.
 Meimberg, H. & G. Heubl 2006. Introduction of a nuclear marker for phylogenetic analysis of Nepenthaceae. Plant Biology 8(6): 831–840. 
 Meimberg, H., S. Thalhammer, A. Brachmann & G. Heubl 2006. Comparative analysis of a translocated copy of the trnK intron in carnivorous family Nepenthaceae. Molecular Phylogenetics and Evolution 39(2): 478–490. 
 Renner, T. & C.D. Specht 2011. A sticky situation: assessing adaptations for plant carnivory in the Caryophyllales by means of stochastic character mapping. International Journal of Plant Sciences 172(7): 889–901. 
 Ridley, H.N. 1915. Nepenthaceæ. [pp. 168–169] In: XIII. The botany of Gunong Tahan, Pahang. Journal of the Federated Malay States Museums 6: 127–202.
 Rottloff, S., U. Müller, R. Kilper & A. Mithöfer 2009. Micropreparation of single secretory glands from the carnivorous plant Nepenthes. Analytical Biochemistry 394(1): 135–137. 
 Rottloff, S., R. Stieber, H. Maischak, F.G. Turini, G. Heubl & A. Mithöfer 2011. Functional characterization of a class III acid endochitinase from the traps of the carnivorous pitcher plant genus, Nepenthes. Journal of Experimental Botany 62(13): 4639–4647. 
 Shivas, R.G. 1984.  Carnivorous Plant Newsletter 13(1): 10–15.
  Syamsuardi & R. Tamin 1994. Kajian kekerabatan jenis-jenis Nepenthes di Sumatera Barat. Project report, Andalas University, Padang. Abstract 
  Syamsuardi 1995. Klasifikasi numerik kantong semar (Nepenthes) di Sumatera Barat. [Numerical classification of pitcher plants (Nepenthes) in West Sumatra.] Journal Matematika dan Pengetahuan Alam 4(1): 48–57. Abstract 
 Wistuba, A. & H. Rischer 1996. Nepenthes lavicola, a new species of Nepenthaceae from the Aceh Province in the North of Sumatra. Carnivorous Plant Newsletter 25(4): 106-111.

External links

 A lower pitcher of N. singalana imaged using optical projection tomography
 Inner World of Nepenthes singalana from the John Innes Centre

Carnivorous plants of Asia
singalana
Endemic flora of Sumatra
Plants described in 1886
Taxa named by Odoardo Beccari